Alex Randall (born in 1982, London) is a British lighting designer and artist. She is probably best known for her use of unconventional materials in large-scale chandeliers, such as taxidermy rawhide and salvaged materials. Her studio is based in London.

Randall first attended the Chelsea School of Art where she studied sculpture and later Falmouth College of Art where she completed an MA in Professional Writing.

In 2006 Randall started her career as a lighting artist and designed her first piece, the award-winning Bakelite Telephone Lamp In 2007 Randall's work started making its way into the marketplace in stores such as Liberty and Harvey Nichols.

Randall's work normally finds its way into boutique hotels, restaurants and private residences as well as the clothing brand Ted Baker. She has designed much of their bespoke lighting pieces for their international stores.

In 2008 Randall started working in the controversial medium of taxidermy She took the ethical stance to work only with already dead or culled animals and so has worked a lot with vermin. Works in this vein range from The Carriers to The Rat Swarm Lamp ‘The most nightmarish lamp ever produced’ and Squirrel Wall Lights.

Randall works collaboratively with the photographer Claire Rosen Their images have won multiple awards.

Randall is involved with the charity Freddie For A Day, creating a large scale cast of the statue of Freddie Mercury for the benefit of the charity.

In 2012 Randall was invited by the boutique Hong Kong based store Lane Crawford to exhibit.

Selected shows 
2012 	Lane Crawford, Hong Kong
2011 The memory collection, The Russian club, Dalston
2011 Guest Speaker- The Day of Light, the Netherlands 
2011		Solo show, Ken Fulk, San Francisco
2010		Tent London 
2010  	‘The Future Perfect’ New York
2009		Stuff and Nonsense. London. 
2009        '100% Design', .		
2008         'Where To?' Solo Show. London. 
2008		'Pulse', London. 
2008		'100% Design', London.
2008		'Trash Luxe', Liberty Department Store, London. 
2007		'Pulse', London. 
2007		'100% Design', London.

Major artworks 
The Antler Chandelier (2010)
Bakelite Phone Lamps (2006)
The Carriers (2011)
Duck Desk Lamp (2009)
In Memory Of Freddie (2011)
The Gramophone Chandelier (2007)
Organ Pipe Chandelier (2008)
Pigeon pendants (2008)
The Rat Swarm Lamp (2010)
Saw Blade Chandelier (2010)
Squirrel Wall lights (2010)
In Memory Of Triumph (2011)

References

External links
 Alex Randall's website
 Watch an interview with Alex talking to Lane Crawford
 Watch an Interview with Alex talking to Asia Tatler
 Dsigndot.com

1982 births
Living people
Lighting designers